Prince ǃGaoseb (born ) is a Namibian rugby union player for the Namibia national team. His regular position is flank.

References

Namibian rugby union players
Living people
1998 births
People from Omaruru
Rugby union flankers
Namibia international rugby union players
People educated at Windhoek High School
Welwitschias players
Leeds Tykes players
Tel Aviv Heat players
Expatriate rugby union players in Israel
Namibian expatriate rugby union players
Namibian expatriate sportspeople in South Africa
Expatriate rugby union players in South Africa
Namibian expatriate sportspeople in Israel
Namibian expatriate sportspeople in England
Expatriate rugby union players in England